Thresher Stadium is a sport stadium in North Newton, Kansas, United States.  The facility is primarily used by the Bethel College for college football and men's and women's soccer teams.  The stadium is also used for local high school and other community events.

References

External links
 Bethel College Athletics official website

American football venues in Kansas
Buildings and structures in Harvey County, Kansas